Elections to Liverpool City Council were held on Thursday 1 November 1945. It was the first local election in which all those who qualified for a parliamentary vote could vote.

After the election, the composition of the council was:

Election result

Ward results

* - Councillor seeking re-election

(PARTY) - Party of former Councillor

As this was the first election since the disruption caused by the Second World War no comparisons are made.

Abercromby

Aigburth

Allerton

Anfield

Breckfield

Brunswick

Castle Street

Childwall

Croxteth

Dingle

Edge Hill

Everton

Exchange

Fairfield

Fazakerley

Garston

Granby

Great George

Kensington

Kirkdale

Little Woolton

Low Hill

Much Woolton

Netherfield

North Scotland

Old Swan

Prince's Park

Sandhills

St. Anne's

St. Domingo

St. Peter's

Sefton Park East

Sefton Park West

South Scotland

Vauxhall

Walton

Warbreck

Wavertree

Wavertree West

West Derby

Aldermanic elections

At the meeting of the City Council on 9 November 1945 the terms of office of twenty of the forty Aldermen expired and the councilors (but not the sitting aldermen) elected twenty Aldermen to fill the vacant positions for a term of six years.
 Alderman re-elected

By-elections

Netherfield, 29 January 1946

Caused by the resignation of Councillor William Matthew Clark (Labour, netherfield, elected 1 November 1938).

Dingle 19 February 1946

Caused by the death of Councillor George William Gillespie (Conservative, Dingle, elected 1 November 1937).

Breckfield, 9 May 1946

Alderman Thomas Dowd died on 19 March 1946.

Councillor Ada Martha Burton (Conservative, elected for the Breckfield ward 1 November 1938) was elected by the councillors as an alderman on 3 April 1946 to fill this vacancy.

Aigburth, 16 May 1946

Caused by the resignation of Councillor William Edward Stirling Napier (Conservative, Aigburth, elected 1 November 1937).

South Scotland, 

Alderman Parick Fay died on 16 April 1946.

Councilor Joseph Harrington (Labour, South Scotland, elected 1 November 1937) was elected by the councillors as an alderman to fill this vacancy.

Childwall
Councillor Stanley Foster (Conservative, Childwall, elected 1 November 1937) died on 18 May 1946.

References

1945 English local elections
1945
1940s in Liverpool